Pontremoli (local) is a small city, comune former Latin Catholic bishopric in the province of Massa and Carrara, Tuscany region, central Italy.

Literally translated, Pontremoli means "Trembling Bridge" (from ponte "bridge" and tremare "to tremble"), as the commune was named after a prominent bridge across the Magra.

History 
Pontremoli is believed to have been first settled around 1000 BC. It was known in Roman times as Apua. The commune later became an independent municipality in 1226 thanks to Frederick II who chartered the free municipality, partly because of its mountainous terrain. This terrain in the valley of the Magra also made Pontremoli a target for numerous conquests from rival Italian and foreign lords. Pontremoli was controlled by various aristocratic families, including the Malaspina (in 1319) and the Antelminelli (in 1322). The conflict between the rival Guelfi and Ghibellini factions in the early fourteenth century resulted in the construction of the Great Bell Tower (Il Campanone) to separate the rival camps. During these Medieval times Pontremoli was often visited by pilgrims travelling from Canterbury (England) to Rome.

In 1331 Pontremoli was sold by John I of Bohemia to Mastino II della Scala (Lord of Verona). Pontremoli was later taken over by the Visconti of Milan in 1339. In 1404 the ownership of Pontremoli once again changed hands as it was seized by the Fieschi family of Genoa. However, by 1433 Pontremoli was again under the control of the Milanese. In 1495 Pontremoli was sacked by the troops of Charles VIII of France. During this time Pontremoli was a territory owned by the House of Sforza, who were the new Dukes of Milan.

Pontremoli was a French territory from 1508 until 1522 as several northern Italian areas were conquered. In 1526, Pontremoli was captured by Charles V of the Holy Roman Empire. Pontremoli was controlled by Spain until 1647, when it was bought by the Republic of Genoa. Three years later, Pontremoli was made part of the (Medici) Grand Duchy of Tuscany. It stayed as such (with the exception of a period of French control from 1805 to 1814) until Italian unification in the 19TH-century. With the Leopoldine reforms, Pontremoli became an autonomous community (whilst still part of the Grand Duchy of Tuscany) in 1777. In 1778, it officially became a City.

The area was heavily damaged by an earthquake in 1834. In November 1847 Pontremoli was occupied (along with Fivizzano) by the Duke of Modena, due to a dispute over trade routes.

Frazioni 
There are 30 frazioni (English civil parishes: neighborhoods or outlying villages legally part of the commune government) in Pontremoli. They are, ordered alphabetically :

Arzelato, Arzengio, Baselica, Bassone, Braia, Bratto, Careola, Cargalla, Casa Corvi, Casalina, Cavezzana d'Antena, Cavezzana Gordana, Ceretoli, Cervara, Dozzano, Gravagna, Grondola, Groppodalosio, Guinadi, Mignegno, Montelungo, Navola, Oppilo, Pieve di Saliceto, Pracchiola San Cristoforo, Succisa, Teglia, Torrano, Traverde and Vignola.

Culture 
More modern attractions of Pontremoli include the annual Premio Bancarella book festival, Medievalis (during August) which is a recollection of the arrival of Emperor Frederick II in Pontremoli in 1226, as well as Il Bar Moderno (a local café), which was in 1970 the winner of a "gold medal" in a Milanese "Ice Cream and Coffee" competition.

There are also several mineral springs in the surrounding mountains and a local market takes place on Wednesdays and Saturdays.

Cuisine 

Local foods unique to Pontremoli include "amor" (a type of small cake, consisting of a creamy filling between wafers), "spongata" (a Christmas cake containing chocolate, honey and hazelnuts, among other ingredients), "torta d'erbe" a pie filled with a mixture which may include bietole (Swiss chard), eggs, ricotta cheese, potato, rice and parmigiano cheese wrapped in a very thin pastry; and testaroli, a flat baked pasta, often served with pesto. Many have suggested that testaroli was actually the first type of pasta. According to an article published by The Wall Street Journal, testaroli is "the earliest recorded pasta."

Main sights 
Among the churches in Pontremoli are:
San Nicolò which houses a wooden cross, dating back several centuries
Chiesa Cattedrale Santa Maria Assunta: the Duomo, built in the 17th century and at one time dedicated to St Geminianus - the cathedral holds many valuable sculptures and paintings. The dome of this cathedral, along with Il Campanone (the bell tower),  dominates the city skyline.
SS. Annunziata with its Augustinian monastery and painted mural is another notable feature within the area.

There are also several buildings concerned with the past noble families of Pontremoli. The major site is the Castello del Piagnaro, one of the largest castles of Lunigiana. Several palaces, such as those of the houses of Malaspina and Dosi, are located within the commune.

The "Museo delle Statue Stele" (situated within the castle) contains a number of Bronze Age stone sculptures representing human figures found in Lunigiana.

Notable people 
In 1802, Alessandro Malaspina took up residence within this area. Mathematician and poet Luigi Poletti, was born in Pontremoli; there is now a road within the city named in his honour. The goalkeeper for Italy in the 1970 FIFA World Cup, Enrico Albertosi, is a notable sportsman to come from the area. Currently, Italian singer Zucchero owns a house in the commune. Ex-professional Queens Park Rangers player Mario Lusardi traces his roots from a small comune in the hills above Pontremoli, named Bratto, where he currently spends his holidays in the picturesque surroundings. American actress Meryl Streep attended her son's wedding at the Castello del Piagnaro in June 2019, and dined at Osteria Oca Bianca.

Sister cities
Pontremoli is twinned with:
  Trenčianske Teplice, Slovakia
  Morières-lès-Avignon, France
  Noto, Italy

See also 
 List of Catholic dioceses in Italy

Notes

References

External links 

 Visitors Guide to Pontremoli
 GCatholic with incumbent bio links
 Article on the Culture of Pontremoli
 Cuisine in Lunigiana
 Article on the History of Pontremoli
 Massa and Carra Tourism section on Pontremoli
 Pontremoli, crossroad of history and culture by turismo.intoscana.it

Cities and towns in Tuscany